The David B. Jones Special was a one-time, passenger train operated by the Atchison, Topeka and Santa Fe Railway from Los Angeles, California, to Chicago, Illinois, at the request of David Benton Jones. David B. Jones was suddenly taken ill with cancer at his winter home "Pepper Hill" in Montecito, California. This run was completed three minutes faster than the more famous 1905 Scott Special. Although not part of the speed run, the train continued on to David B. Jones' summer home in Lake Forest, Illinois.

Overall trip summary 
The train left La Grande Station at Los Angeles at 11:33 PM May 5, 1923, Pacific Time and arrived in Chicago at 12:50 AM on May 8 Central Time. The  journey was completed "in exactly 47 hours and 27 minutes." The actual running time was only 44 hours and 51 minutes which deducts time spent for stops such as those for coal and water and the 55-minute delay caused by the breakdown of a Union Pacific locomotive ahead of the special at Nebo, California. The running time was therefore three minutes less than the Scott Special. It was "a phenomenal run when compared with the regular Santa Fe limited time of sixty-eight hours and thirty minutes." The $11,000 special thus saved about 20 hours over the time of the regularly scheduled train. ($11,000 is equivalent to $ in present-day terms.) "Mr. Jones' daughter, Gwendolyn Jones; his brother [Thomas D.], a doctor and two nurses accompanied him on the trip."

Speed and time over selected segments 
The special train traveled over selected segments as follows:
F. M. Gillette, engineer, and W. L. Evens, fireman on locomotive 1370 ran between Los Angeles and Barstow, California-—on the Los Angeles Division in 3 hours and 26 minutes. This included:
 34 minutes in the first  to Lamanda Park, Pasadena, California, due to a slow order, and
 16 minutes taking water and testing the air brakes, and
 27 minutes climbing a "stiff" mountain grade (Cajon Pass).

The  run between Seligman, Arizona, and Albuquerque, New Mexico, on the Albuquerque Division was scheduled for 12 hours, but completed in 9 hours and 32 minutes. 

"The stretch between Dodge City and Newton, Kansas, was covered at 65 miles per hour [(105 km/h)]."

This was "thirty minutes faster than the Scott Special."

After arriving in Chicago 
"Upon arrival here [Chicago] it was switched back over the Northwestern track to Lake Forest, arriving there at 3:46 p.m. This switchback, however, is not counted in making the record."

Legacy 
The run "was in the nature of staging a comeback at the aviation record in the non-stop flight from New York to San Diego last week." However, the run was only marginally faster than the Scott Special.

Notes

References 

Passenger trains of the Atchison, Topeka and Santa Fe Railway
Named passenger trains of the United States
1923 in rail transport
May 1923 events